Ernest Désiré Glasson (1839 - 1907) was a French academic, jurist, professor of civil procedure and specialist in the history of French, Roman, and comparative law.

1839 births
1907 deaths
French academics
French jurists
Officiers of the Légion d'honneur
19th-century jurists